Third Matinee (or 3rd Matinee) was an American rock band formed by vocalist and bassist Richard Page with keyboardist Patrick Leonard. The group formed after the breakup of Page's band, Mr. Mister, and the demise of Leonard's band, Toy Matinee. Third Matinee released one album, Meanwhile (1994), a progressive-pop rock album, through Warner Bros Records.

Discography

References

American rock music groups